The 1920–21 Columbia men's ice hockey season was the 20th season of play for the program.

Season
After resigning from the Intercollegiate Hockey Association in 1912 the ice hockey team had difficulties scheduling games due to no longer having the St. Nicholas Rink as a venue. The team was unable to play a single game in either 1916 or 1917 and while a group of students did manage to play four games during the 1917–18 season, it was done informally and not as representatives of Columbia University. In 1920 an effort was made to revive the team and the 181st Street Ice Palace was secured as a practice facility. Once enough interest had been demonstrated and a team was formed, manager A. L. Walker Jr. put together a tentative schedule.

Columbia opened its season against Yale and, unsurprisingly for a team that hadn't played in six seasons, lost 5–7. The Lions took more than two weeks to play their next game and, once they did, they found themselves on a sheet of ice nearly double the size of their practice rink. In their game against Williams the team began well, leading 1–0 after the first, but slumped badly in the middle frame, allowing 5 goals and losing any chance they had at winning their first game of the season.

After letting another early lead slip away against Cornell a lineup change seemed to give Columbia the spark they needed and the Lions mauled Colgate 11–3, winning their first game in over six years.

Roster

Standings

Schedule and Results

|-
!colspan=12 style=";" | Regular Season

Scoring Statistics

Note: Assists were not recorded as a statistic.

References

Columbia Lions men's ice hockey seasons
Columbia
Columbia
Columbia
Columbia